The 1890 Louisville Colonels baseball team finished with an 88–44 record and won the American Association championship. The previous season, the Colonels had lost 111 games, the most any team in the Major Leagues had lost up to that point (the record was broken during the 1890 season by the Pittsburgh Alleghenys, who lost 113 games). This "worst to first" transformation was accomplished partly because of new ownership led by Barney Dreyfuss. Competition was also diminished due to the advent of the Players' League and a couple of the best AA teams jumping to the National League.

After the season, Louisville played the NL champions, the Brooklyn Bridegrooms, in the 1890 World Series. The Bridegrooms were one of the teams that had jumped to the NL, and had been the champions of the AA in 1889. The World Series wound up in a 3–3–1 tie.

Regular season

Season standings

Record vs. opponents

Opening Day lineup

Roster

Player stats

Batting

Starters by position
Note: Pos = Position; G = Games played; AB = At bats; H = Hits; Avg. = Batting average; HR = Home runs; RBI = Runs batted in

Other batters
Note: G = Games played; AB = At bats; H = Hits; Avg. = Batting average; HR = Home runs; RBI = Runs batted in

Pitching

Starting pitchers
Note: G = Games pitched; GS = Games started; IP = Innings pitched; W = Wins; L = Losses; ERA = Earned run average; SO = Strikeouts

1890 World Series

Louisville, champions of the American Association, played the National League champions, the Brooklyn Bridegrooms in the 1890 World Series. The series pitted the two most recent American Association champions against each other.

The series winner was to be the first to win four games. Brooklyn started strong, winning the first two games in Louisville, with game 3 called after eight innings with the score tied. Louisville salvaged the fourth game, which was the last one played in Louisville. After Brooklyn won the first game at home to take a 3–1 lead, Louisville came back to win two straight. However, bad weather forced any remaining games to be canceled, with the plan that a deciding game would be played before the 1891 season began. However, due to inter-league disputes, that never occurred, and the series officially ended in a 3–3–1 tie.

References
 1890 Louisville Colonels team page at Baseball Reference

Louisville Colonels seasons
Louisville Colonels season
Louisville Colonels